The Grand Street station is a station on the BMT Canarsie Line of the New York City Subway. Located at the intersection of Grand Street and Bushwick Avenue in Brooklyn, it is served by the L train at all times.

History
This station opened on June 30, 1924 as part of the initial segment of the Canarsie Line, a product of the Dual Contracts, stretching from Sixth Avenue station in Manhattan to Montrose Avenue station.

In 2019, the Metropolitan Transportation Authority announced that this station would become ADA-accessible as part of the agency's 2020–2024 Capital Program. A contract for two elevators at the station was awarded in December 2020.

Station layout

This underground station has two side platforms with two tracks. The mosaic band on both platforms features greys along with aqua, orange, ochre, light blue and light green. Near the south end of the station, there are gratings near the ceiling, with the tile band cut out to fit around them. A historically correct section of replacement tile can also be seen in this area. The name tablets read "GRAND ST." in serif font on a brown background, yellow inner border, and green outer border. There are no columns on the platforms since they are on a curve except for some blue i-beam ones at the center where fare control is.

Exits
Because of its proximity to street level due to cut-and-cover construction, there is no free transfer between directions and fare control is at platform level. Both sides have a turnstile bank, token booth, and two staircases to the streets. The ones on the Manhattan-bound side go up to either eastern corners of Bushwick Avenue and Grand Street while the ones on the Canarsie-bound side go up to either western corners.

References

External links 

 
 Station Reporter — L Train
 The Subway Nut — Grand Street Pictures
 Grand Street entrance from Google Maps Street View
 Platforms from Google Maps Street View (2015)
Platforms from Google Maps Street View (2018)

BMT Canarsie Line stations
New York City Subway stations in Brooklyn
Railway stations in the United States opened in 1924
Williamsburg, Brooklyn
Grand Street and Grand Avenue